The Twelve Doors of Mali were the possessions of the Mansa (emperor) of the medieval Mali Empire which was established in c.. 1235 following The Battle of Kirina.  These lands were either allied to or conquered by Sundiata Keita (the first Emperor of Imperial Mali) on his campaign to free the Mandinka heartland from the Sosso kingdom of Kaniaga.

The Twelve Doors
Following his victory at Kirina, Sundiata Keita united the twelve towns of Mande known as the "twelve doors of Mali." He pacified these twelve towns and went on to bring prosperity to the land The twelve doors of Mali are listed below:

Bambougou, conquered by Fakoli Koroma
The lands of the Bozo people, allied to Mali
Djedeba, allied to Mali
Do, from which all future Keita queens (such as Sogolon Condé, Sundiata's mother) would come from, allied to Mali 
Jalo, conquered by Fran Kamara
Kaniaga, conquered by Mari Djata I (commonly known as Sundiata Keita)
Kri, allied to Mali
Oualata, conquered by Mari Djata I
Siby, allied to Mali
Tabon, allied to Mali
Toron, allied to Mali
Zaghari, allied to Mali

Historical significance
The twelve doors were the base of the Manden Kurufa (Manden Federation).  With future conquests and re-organization, they would transform into the provinces of the Mali Empire.  They remained important in the political and military circles of imperial power until the end of the Mali Empire in 1645.

Notes

Mali Empire
History of Mali